Philippe Mull (born 12 November 1964) is a French eventing rider. He won a team silver medal at the 1998 World Equestrian Games, where he also placed 21st in the individual event aboard Viens du Frêne.

References

External links
 

Living people
1964 births
French male equestrians
Event riders